Dagvaktin is a sequel to the Icelandic television series Næturvaktin. It is the second of the three series in the trilogy. The three main characters from Næturvaktin, Georg Bjarnfreðarson (Jón Gnarr), Ólafur Ragnar (Pétur Jóhann Sigfússon) and Daníel (Jörundur Ragnarsson), all return to work at a hotel in the sparsely populated Westfjords (near Reykhólar).

It was first broadcast on Stöð 2 on 21 September 2008, and was subsequently released on DVD.

External links
 

Icelandic comedy television series
Icelandic-language television shows
2008 Icelandic television series debuts
2000s Icelandic television series
Stöð 2 original programming